A mobile multi-coloured composite (MMCC) is a two dimensional coloured barcode designed to distribute media via traditional print media, without the need for network connectivity. MMCC barcodes are designed to be scanned with ordinary camera-phones (from VGA resolution onward).

MMCC is being developed at Edith Cowan University by Drs Alfred Tan and Douglas Chai. "A provisional patent has been filed and capital is being sought to develop a suite of mobile encoding and decoding software for mainstream, low-resolution camera mobile phones.

References

External links
 
 Activities and projects of the  Mobile Barcodes Research Group at Edith Cowan University

Barcodes